Killers in the House is a 1998 made for TV film directed by Michael Schultz starring Mario Van Peebles, Holly Robinson Peete, and Hal Linden. Bank robbers hold a family hostage in a newly inherited mansion. The movie was filmed in Vancouver, British Columbia. The film aired on the USA Network.

Cast
 Mario Van Peebles as Rodney Sawyer
 Holly Robinson Peete as Jennie Sawyer
 Andrew Divoff as Delaney Breckett
 Hal Linden as Arthur Pendleton
 Michael J. Pagan as Malik Sawyer
 Ty Olsson as 2nd Bank Guard
 Josh Holland as Billy Dupree

External links
 

1998 television films
1998 films
USA Network original films
Films directed by Michael Schultz